The following are lists of the major honours won by basketball clubs in Serbia. It lists every Serbian professional basketball club, both men's and women's, to have won one of the two major Serbian national domestic trophies, the Adriatic trophies, and any of the major official European continental-wide competitions.

Key

Men's clubs
Note: Statistics are correct through the end of the 2021–22 season.

Women's clubs
Note: Statistics are correct through the end of the 2021–22 season.

Combined honors
Note: Statistics are correct through the end of the 2021–22 season.

The following is a list of combined trophies of both men and women teams who has a parent club, including only those who won titles in both genders.

See also 
 List of European Major Basketball club competition winners
 List of FIBA Europe women's club competition winners
 List of basketball clubs in Greece by major honours won

Notes

References

External links

honours